The 2020 Portland Timbers 2 season is the sixth season for Portland Timbers 2 in the USL Championship, the second-tier professional soccer league in the United States and Canada.

Club

Competitions

Preseason

USL Championship

Match results

Standings — Group A

Results summary

U.S. Open Cup 

Due to their ownership by a higher division professional club (Portland Timbers), Timbers 2 is one of 15 teams expressly forbidden from entering the Cup competition.

References

Portland Timbers 2 seasons
Portland Timbers 2
2020 in Portland, Oregon
Portland
Portland Timbers 2
Sports in Hillsboro, Oregon